Daniel Margush (born 28 November 1997) is an Australian professional footballer who plays as a goalkeeper for Western Sydney Wanderers in the A-League.

Club career

Adelaide Raiders 
Daniel Margush joined Adelaide Raiders in 2014.

Adelaide United 
Margush made his debut for Adelaide United in a win over Central Coast Mariners in January 2016. He was a surprise call-up to the starting side after John Hall was called up to Australia under-23 and Eugene Galekovic was injured in the week leading up to the match. In January 2020, he departed Adelaide United.

Perth Glory 
A week and a half after leaving Adelaide United, Margush joined Perth Glory on a two-year deal. In November 2020, he mutually terminated his contract.

Western Sydney Wanderers 
Following leaving Perth Glory, Margush signed a two-year deal at Western Sydney Wanderers.

International career
Margush was first called up to the Australia under-20 for 2016 AFC U-19 Championship qualification. He was again called up for the 2016 AFF U-19 Youth Championship. He made his debut in Australia's opening match of the competition, a win over Cambodia.

Career statistics

Club

Honours

Club 
Adelaide United Youth
 South Australian State League 1: 2015

Adelaide United
 A-League Premiership: 2015–16

International 
Australia
 AFF U-19 Youth Championship: 2016

References

External links

Living people
1997 births
Association football goalkeepers
Australia under-20 international soccer players
Australian soccer players
Adelaide United FC players
Perth Glory FC players
Western Sydney Wanderers FC players
A-League Men players
National Premier Leagues players